Headnoise, is early eighties old school female fronted, guitar driven, powerfully fast hardcore punk rock band. Founded in 1994 from the streets of Los Angeles, they have shared the stage with bands like, DI, Agent Orange, Chron Gen, JFA, T.S.O.L., Circle One, 7 seconds, Decry, Shattered Faith, Spider and others. They were on the forefront of the Southern California-based "JCHC" underground movement, along with Officer Negative, following in the footsteps of bands like The Crucified, Nobody Special, and Scaterd Few.

Musical Style and Beliefs
The band is characterized as being extremely bold and uncompromising about their faith, with guitar-driven, powerfully fast, yet sophisticated hardcore punk music and provocative lyrics. Their songs deal with a range of themes including modern pragmaticism, social injustice, personal struggles, and practical spiritual insights.

Relocation to Chicago
Originally based in Los Angeles, California, Headnoise relocated to Chicago in the year 2000 to join  "JPUSA" aka Jesus people USA.

Retirement, Reunion and Reunification
After a decade of touring and releasing five albums, Headnoise announced their retirement in the winter of 2005, citing a desire to focus on their families and other ministry callings. However, the band did re-form shortly thereafter with only the Goodwins as original members.  This incarnation lasted from 2011 to 2012, resulting in sparse shows and one short tour. The band never did write and record the long-awaited follow-up release to their last record, For Now We Know In Part:1. Headnoise reformed in 2017 and are playing shows again with a new lineup.

Original Lineup
 Robert Goodwin - bass
 Edie Goodwin - vocals
 Sid Duffour - guitar
 Casey Logan - drums

Current lineup
 Edie Goodwin - vocals
 Robert Goodwin - bass, backing vocals
 Gilbert Estrada - drums, backing vocals
 Tom Wright - guitar

References

External links
Grrr Records Bio
Interview with Rhythmstx Magazine
Review in HM Magazine
Headnoise Bandcamp

Christian punk groups
Christian rock groups from California
Christian rock groups from Illinois
Musical groups established in 1994
Musical groups from Orange County, California
1994 establishments in California